Dazhou Jinya Airport  is an airport serving Dazhou, Sichuan, China. It was opened on May 19, 2022 and replaced the old Dazhou Heshi Airport.

Construction of the airport started on 31 October 2016. Once completed, it will be the largest civil aviation airport in Northeast Sichuan. It will have an annual capacity of 2.35 million passengers and 21,000 tons of cargo.

Airlines and destinations

References 

Airports in Sichuan
Dazhou
Transport in Sichuan